Jennifer Sadleir  (born Jennifer Vejprava on January 10, 1981 in Calgary, Alberta) is a Canadian curler. She previously played lead for Cheryl Bernard out of the Calgary Curling Club in Calgary.

Curling career

1997–2010
Sadleir is a three time Alberta Junior Champion winning in 1998, 2000 and 2002. At the 2000 Canadian Juniors, playing as a second, her team finished the Canadian Junior Championship with a bronze medal. At the 2002 Canadian Junior Curling Championships, she would skip Alberta to a 7-5 round robin record, missing the playoffs. Sadleir would also participate in two Alberta Provincial Women’s Championships the first in 2003 and again in 2004. She has also played in two Alberta Mixed Championships in 2002 and 2004.

2011–current
At the end of the 2010/2011 curling season Sadleir would join Calgary skip Cheryl Bernard as lead.

Sadleir was only with the Bernard team for one season

Personal life
Sadleir is married and has a son and daughter.

References

1981 births
Canadian women curlers
Living people
Curlers from Calgary